Gävleborg County is one of the 29 multi-member constituencies of the Riksdag, the national legislature of Sweden. The constituency was established in 1970 when the Riksdag changed from a bicameral legislature to a unicameral legislature. It is conterminous with the county of Gävleborg. The constituency currently elects nine of the 349 members of the Riksdag using the open party-list proportional representation electoral system. At the 2022 general election it had 221,395 registered electors.

Electoral system
Gävleborg County currently elects nine of the 349 members of the Riksdag using the open party-list proportional representation electoral system. Constituency seats are allocated using the modified Sainte-Laguë method. Only parties that that reach the 4% national threshold and parties that receive at least 12% of the vote in the constituency compete for constituency seats. Supplementary leveling seats may also be allocated at the constituency level to parties that reach the 4% national threshold.

Election results

Summary

(Excludes leveling seats)

Detailed

2020s

2022
Results of the 2022 general election held on 11 September 2022:

The following candidates were elected:
 Constituency seats - Sanna Backeskog (S), 916 votes; Lars Beckman (M), 1,387 votes; Roger Hedlund (SD), 187 votes; Anders W. Jonsson (C), 854 votes; Kristoffer Lindberg (S), 1,349 votes; Patrik Lundqvist (S), 1,065 votes; Daniel Persson (SD), 16 votes; Viktor Wärnick (M), 630 votes; and Linnéa Wickman (S), 479 votes.
 Leveling seats - Lili André (KD), 234 votes; and Samuel Gonzalez Westling (V), 446 votes.

2010s

2018
Results of the 2018 general election held on 9 September 2018:

The following candidates were elected:
 Constituency seats - Ulla Andersson (V), 1,103 votes; Lars Beckman (M), 1,502 votes; Roger Hedlund (SD), 279 votes; Anders W. Jonsson (C), 951 votes; Åsa Lindestam (S), 1,156 votes; Elin Lundgren (S), 1,213 votes; Patrik Lundqvist (S), 924 votes; Thomas Morell (SD), 13 votes; and Viktor Wärnick (M), 489 votes.

2014
Results of the 2014 general election held on 14 September 2014:

The following candidates were elected:
 Constituency seats - Mikael Eskilandersson (SD), 0 votes; Mikael Jansson (SD), 6 votes; Anders W. Jonsson (C), 1,215 votes; Margareta Kjellin (M), 484 votes; Åsa Lindestam (S), 1,179 votes; Elin Lundgren (S), 1,256 votes; Patrik Lundqvist (S), 890 votes; Raimo Pärssinen (S), 2,406 votes; and Tomas Tobé (M), 2,589 votes.
 Leveling seats - Ulla Andersson (V), 1,103 votes; and Anders Schröder (MP), 341 votes.

2010
Results of the 2010 general election held on 19 September 2010:

The following candidates were elected:
 Constituency seats - Ulla Andersson (V), 979 votes; Lars Beckman (M), 739 votes; Richard Jomshof (SD), 15 votes; Anders W. Jonsson (C), 1,008 votes; Margareta Kjellin (M), 1,154 votes; Åsa Lindestam (S), 1,662 votes; Elin Lundgren (S), 1,063 votes; Raimo Pärssinen (S), 2,711 votes; Per Svedberg (S), 887 votes; and Tomas Tobé (M), 4,070 votes.
 Leveling seats - Hans Backman (FP), 446 votes; and Bodil Ceballos (MP), 629 votes.

2000s

2006
Results of the 2006 general election held on 17 September 2006:

The following candidates were elected:
 Constituency seats - Ulla Andersson (V), 729 votes; Hans Backman (FP), 460 votes; Sven Bergström (C), 2,411 votes; Sinikka Bohlin (S), 222 votes; Margareta Kjellin (M), 934 votes; Åsa Lindestam (S), 569 votes; Ulrica Messing (S), 7,836 votes; Raimo Pärssinen (S), 982 votes; Per Svedberg (S), 485 votes; and Tomas Tobé (M), 2,470 votes.
 Leveling seats - Bodil Ceballos (MP), 400 votes.

2002
Results of the 2002 general election held on 15 September 2002:

The following candidates were elected:
 Constituency seats - Hans Backman (FP), 570 votes; Sven Bergström (C), 2,728 votes; Sinikka Bohlin (S), 410 votes; Owe Hellberg (V), 702 votes; Åsa Lindestam (S), 453 votes; Ragnwi Marcelind (KD), 1,372 votes; Ulrica Messing (S), 7,965 votes; Patrik Norinder (M), 1,267 votes; Raimo Pärssinen (S), 1,428 votes; and Per-Olof Svensson (S), 786 votes.
 Leveling seats - Lotta Nilsson-Hedström (MP), 589 votes.

1990s

1998
Results of the 1998 general election held on 20 September 1998:

The following candidates were elected:
 Constituency seats - Erik Åsbrink (S), 5,969 votes; Sven Bergström (C), 2,562 votes; Sinikka Bohlin (S), 498 votes; Owe Hellberg (V), 1,898 votes; Ragnwi Marcelind (KD), 865 votes; Ulrica Messing (S), 4,544 votes; Patrik Norinder (M), 2,536 votes; Yvonne Oscarsson (V), 1,196 votes; Raimo Pärssinen (S), 764 votes; and Per-Olof Svensson (S), 1,021 votes.
 Leveling seats - Anne-Katrine Dunker (M), 926 votes; and Thomas Julin (MP), 691 votes.

1994
Results of the 1994 general election held on 18 September 1994:

1991
Results of the 1991 general election held on 15 September 1991:

1980s

1988
Results of the 1988 general election held on 18 September 1988:

1985
Results of the 1985 general election held on 15 September 1985:

1982
Results of the 1982 general election held on 19 September 1982:

1970s

1979
Results of the 1979 general election held on 16 September 1979:

1976
Results of the 1976 general election held on 19 September 1976:

1973
Results of the 1973 general election held on 16 September 1973:

1970
Results of the 1970 general election held on 20 September 1970:

References

Riksdag constituency
Riksdag constituencies
Riksdag constituencies established in 1970